Causeway Road is a main road in Hong Kong. Situated in Causeway Bay, it joins Yee Wo Street in the west and King's Road. It is a boundary of Eastern District and Wan Chai District. North side of the road is Victoria Park in Eastern District while in the Wan Chai District in the south are Queen's College and Hong Kong Central Library.

History
The road was evolved from a causeway across Causeway Bay (Tung Lo Wan) in the mid-19th century. Before the construction of the road, another road Tung Lo Wan Road was the only road connecting two side of the bay. In 1883, Hong Kong Government reclaimed the bay within the causeway and the causeway was renovated as Causeway along the sea shore. Its Cantonese name  (ko sze wai dou) was after the English pronunciation of the road. Trams run to and from the embankment. In 1951, the north of road was reclaimed for Victoria Park.

Features
 Causeway Bay Sports Ground
 Hong Kong Central Library
 Queen's College
 Victoria Park
 3 stops of Hong Kong Tramways: Shelter Street Stop, Victoria Park Stop, Hing Fat Street Stop

See also
List of streets and roads in Hong Kong

External links

Google Maps of Causeway Road

Causeway Bay
Roads in Hong Kong